Corentin Jallon is an Algerian-French Kickboxer. He is the former World Kickboxing Network (WKN) Cruiserweight World Champion as well as the Muaythai & K-1 FFSCDA France -91kg Champion, King of the Ring -91kg Champion and he has competed in SUPERKOMBAT. Jallon became the WKN World Champion in 2013 after defeating Cristian Bosch in Buenos Aires, Argentina.

Early life
Jallon was born in France and was introduced to kickboxing at a later age. He competed in his first match at the age 26 years old in the C-Class division. He started training with his coach Badri Rouabhia at AJSR Saint Raphaël.

Career

Kickboxing 
On Juin 30, 2012, Jallon faced Zinedine Hameur-Lain at the Pro fightKarate 4 in the heavyweight category and lost on points.

On May 24, 2014, Jallon fought Sebastian Ciobanu -95 kg to a draw with at SUPERKOMBAT World Grand Prix II 2014 in Constanta, Romania.

On May 10, 2014, Jallon avenged his previous 2012 loss and rematched Zinedine Hameur-Lain at King of the Ring 3 in Longeville-lès-Metz, Metz, France, winning by TKO in the first round.

On September 23, 2017, Jallon faced Romain Falendry and lost by decision.

On December 2, 2017, Jallon faced the Spanish Ivan Valenzuela at La 13ème Nuit Du Muay Thai in France and won by decision.

On April 27, 2019, Jallon faced Gabriele Casella at Fighting Spirit 7 in Rome, Italy and lost by decision.

On December 14, 2019, Jallon faced Anthony Valerde under K-1 rules in L'Isle-sur-la-Sorgue, France and lost by decision.

WKN 
On October 13, 2012, Jallon had his first shot at a World Kickboxing Network title, when he faced 2007 WAKO World Championship finalist and PFL fighter Sadibou Sy. The match was for the WKN European Cruiserweight title in Berns, Stockholm. Both athletes threw some hard strikes, but ultimately the fight went to the judges, declaring Sadibou Sy victorious by decision.

In 2013, during a noticeable winning streak, Jallon was offered to fight against the current WKN Cruiserweight Champion (-195 lbs/-88.5 kg), Argentinian Cristian Bosch. On August 4, 2013, Jallon faced Bosch in Buenos Aires, Argentina. The first round started wrong for Jallon received some heavy damage from the champion, resulting in two standing 8 counts. In the third round, Jallon landed an elbow on Bosch's face, securing the knockout win and become the new WKN Cruiserweight Champion.

On May 15, 2015, Jallon defended his WKN cruiserweight title against the Czech Ondrej Srubek in Prague, winning on points.

On September 12, 2015, Jallon put his WKN title on the line when he faced the Slovak Adrian Valentin in Saint-Raphaël, France. Jallon shook Valentin early with some punches, but the Slovak recovered well and was able to land many shots from the outside in the following rounds. Adrian Valentin was declared winner by decision, capturing the WKN Cruiserweight title.

Lethwei 
In 2017, Jallon challenged Dave Leduc, Openweight Lethwei World Champion under traditional Lethwei rules. The traditional challenge was accepted and on December 10, 2017, Jallon faced Leduc inside the Thein Pyu Stadium in Yangon, Myanmar. Just before their first exchange, Leduc performed the Lekkha moun and Jallon automatically replied with a flurry of punches, which Leduc countered with an elbow counterattack. Jallon was floored several times during the fight and used his two minute injury time-out, but finished the bout on his feet, making it a draw according to Lethwei rules. Leduc retained the openweight Lethwei World championship title.

Championships and accomplishments

Championships 
  World Kickboxing Network
 WKN Cruiserweight World Championship (one time)
 Other championships
  King of the Ring 3 Champion -91 kg
  FFSCDA National Muaythai Champion -91 kg
  FFSCDA National K-1 Champion -91 kg

Lethwei record 

|-  bgcolor="#c5d2ea"
| 2017-12-10|| Draw ||align=left| Dave Leduc || 2018 Myanmar Lethwei World Championship || Yangon, Myanmar || Draw || 5 || 3:00
|-
! style=background:white colspan=9 |
|-
| colspan=9 | Legend:

Kickboxing record

|-  style="background:#cfc;"
| 2021-12-18 || Win ||align=left| Giorgio Muccini || La Nuit des Challenges 20 || Saint-Fons, France || TKO (Referee stoppage) || 1|| 
|-
|-  style="background:#fbb;"
| 2021-12-04 || Loss ||align=left| Diaguely Camara || K1 Event 14 || Troyes, France || Decision (Unanimous) || 3 || 3:00 
|-
|-  style="background:#fbb;"
| 2019-12-14 || Loss ||align=left| Anthony Valerde || 10 Deal Event II || L'Isle-sur-la-Sorgue, France || Decision || 3 || 3:00 
|-
|-  style="background: #c5d2ea"
| 2019-07-07 || Draw ||align=left| Enrico Pellegrino || Thai Night 2 || Lecce, Italy || Draw || 3 || 3:00
|-
|-  style="background:#fbb;"
| 2019-04-27 || Loss ||align=left| Gabriele Casella || Fighting Spirit 7 || Rome, Italy || Decision || 5 || 3:00 
|-
|-  style="background:#cfc;"
| 2018-12-01 || Win ||align=left| Angelo Mirno || Extreme Fight For Heroes 6 || Draguignan, France || Decision|| 5 || 3:00
|-
|-  style="background:#fbb;"
| 2018-06-23 || Loss ||align=left| Anthony Leroy || Le Spartacus III || Nice, France || Decision || 3 || 3:00 
|-
|-  style="background:#cfc;"
|2017-12-02 || Win ||align=left| Ivan Valenzuela || La 13ème Nuit Du Muay Thai  || Saint-Pryvé-Saint-Mesmin, France || Decision|| 5 || 3:00
|-
|-  style="background:#fbb;"
| 2017-09-23 || Loss ||align=left| Romain Falendry || Extreme Fight For Heroes 5 || Saint-Tropez, France || Decision || 3 || 3:00 
|-
|-  style="background:#cfc;"
| 2016-04-02 || Win ||align=left| Jean Philippe Guigo || Extreme Fight For Heroes 4 || Draguignan, France || KO || 2 || 
|-
|-  style="background:#fbb;"
| 2015-11-14 || Loss ||align=left| Halim Chibani || Nuit des Champions 2015 || Marseille, France || Decision || 3 || 3:00 
|-
|-  style="background:#fbb;"
| 2015-09-12 || Loss ||align=left| Adrian Valentin || Battle of Saint-Raphael 3 || Saint-Tropez, France || Decision || 3 || 3:00 
|-
! style="background:white" colspan=9 |  
|-
|-  style="background:#cfc;"
| 2015-07-04 || Win ||align=left| Umberto Lucci || MFC 2 || Lons-le-Saunier, France || Decision || 3 || 3:00 
|-
|-  style="background:#cfc;"
| 2015-05-25 || Win ||align=left| Ondej Srubek || Simply The Best 4 || Prague, Czech Republic || Decision || 3 || 3:00 
|-
|-  style="background:#cfc;"
| 2015-04-11 || Win ||align=left| Jean-Philippe Guigo || Battle of Saint Raphael 2 || Saint-Raphaël, France || Decision || 3 || 3:00
|-
|-  style="background:#fbb;"
| 2014-08-04 || Loss ||align=left| Filip Verlinden || Fight Night Saint-Tropez II || Saint-Tropez, France || Decision || 3 || 3:00 
|-
|-  style="background:#cfc;"
| 2014-06-27 || Win ||align=left| Pacôme Assi || Battle of Saint Raphael 2 || Saint-Raphaël, France || Decision || 3 || 3:00 
|-
|-  style="background: #c5d2ea"
| 2014-05-24 || Draw ||align=left| Sebastian Ciobanu || SUPERKOMBAT World Grand Prix II 2014 || Constanta, Romania || Draw || 3 || 3:00
|-
|-  style="background:#cfc;"
| 2014-05-10 || Win ||align=left| Zinedine Hameur-Lain || King of the Ring 3 || Metz, France || TKO || 1 ||
|-
! style="background:white" colspan=9 | 
|-
|-  style="background:#cfc;"
| 2013-11-23 || Win ||align=left| Hichem Medoukali || Nuit des Champions 2013 || Marseille, France || KO || 2 ||
|-
|-  style="background:#cfc;"
| 2013-10-04 || Win ||align=left| Christian Bosch || Cedem de Caseros || Buenos Aires, Argentina || KO || 3 ||
|-
! style="background:white" colspan=9 |  
|-
|-  style="background:#cfc;"
| 2013-06-15 || Win ||align=left| Vladislav Alexandrov || The Battle of Saint-Raphael || Saint-Raphaël, France || TKO || 2 ||
|-
|-  style="background:#cfc;"
| 2013-05-10 || Win ||align=left| Ulrich Emmanuel || The Game || Saint-Denis, Réunion, France || KO || 2 ||
|-
! style="background:white" colspan=9 |  
|-
|-  style="background:#cfc;"
| 2013-04-27 || Win ||align=left| Mohamed Chaher || Championnat d'Europe K1 Rules || Sainte-Maxime, France || Decision || 3 || 3:00
|-
! style="background:white" colspan=9 |  
|-  style="background:#cfc;"
| 2012-12-15 || Win ||align=left| Fabien Fouquet || Championnat du Monde K1 rules || Saint-Raphaël, France || TKO || 2 ||
|-
|-  style="background:#fbb;"
| 2012-06-30 || Loss ||align=left| Zinedine Hameur-Lain || Pro Fight Karaté 4, Semi Finals || Levallois-Perret, France || Decision || 3 || 3:00
|-
|-  style="background:#cfc;"
| 2011-06-18 || Win ||align=left| Samih Bachar || Gala de Muaythai France || Nanterre, France || Decision || 3 || 3:00
|-
|-  style="background:#cfc;"
| 2011-05-07 || Win ||align=left| Rida Titri || Gala Remi Telani 7 || Villeurbanne, France || KO || 2 ||
|-
|-  style="background:#cfc;"
| 2011-04-02 || Win ||align=left| Khalid Azzouzi || Gala Remi Telani 7 || La Crau, France || KO || 1 ||
|-
|-  style="background:#fbb;"
| 2011-03-06 || Loss ||align=left| Arnold Oborotov || KO Bloodline Show || London, England || KO || 1 ||
|-
|-  bgcolor="#fbb"
| 2010-04-24 || Loss ||align=left| Stéphane Susperregui || Fight Zone 4  || Villeurbanne, France || Decision || 3 || 3:00
|-
|-  style="background:#cfc;"
| 2010-04-03 || Win ||align=left| David Radeff || K1 Events, Championnat d'Europe de K1 || Troyes, France || Decision || 3 || 3:00
|-
|-  style="background:#cfc;"
| 2009-12-05 || Win ||align=left| Mohamed Benyach || The Punishment || Anderlecht, Belgium || Decision || 3 || 3:00
|-
|-  style="background:#cfc;"
| 2009-09-02 || Win ||align=left| Salatun || Chaweng Stadium || Koh Samui, Thailand || Decision || 5 || 3:00
|-
|-  style="background:#fbb;"
| 2009-00-00 || Loss ||align=left| Besim Kabashi || Steko's Fight Night || Munich, Germany || Decision || 3 || 3:00
|-
|-  style="background:#fbb;"
| 2008-12-06 || Loss ||align=left| Thor Hoopman || Evolution 15 || Brisbane, Australia || KO || 5 || 
|-
| colspan=9 | Legend:

See also
List of male kickboxers

References

Living people
Sportspeople from Var (department)
Cruiserweight kickboxers
Heavyweight kickboxers
French male kickboxers
French Lethwei practitioners
French Muay Thai practitioners
SUPERKOMBAT kickboxers
Year of birth missing (living people)
Kickboxing champions
People from Saint-Raphaël, Var